The Greater Antilles mangroves is a mangrove ecoregion that includes the coastal mangrove forests of the Greater Antilles – Cuba, Hispaniola, Jamaica, and Puerto Rico.

Geography
Mangroves are estimated to cover 5,569 km in Cuba (or 4.8% of the country); 134 km in Haiti; 325 km in the Dominican Republic; and 106 km in Jamaica.

Some ecoregion systems include the Greater Antilles mangroves, Bahamian mangroves, and Lesser Antilles mangroves within a single Bahamian-Antillean mangroves ecoregion.

Protected areas
30.5% of the ecoregion is in protected areas. These include La Cahouane and Three Bays Protected Area in Haiti.

References

External links
 
 Bahamian-Antillean mangroves (DOPA)
 Greater Antilles mangroves (Encyclopedia of Earth)

Ecoregions of Cuba
Ecoregions of the Dominican Republic
Ecoregions of Haiti
Ecoregions of Jamaica
Ecoregions of Puerto Rico
Mangrove ecoregions
Neotropical ecoregions